Wells High School is a public high school located in Wells, Texas (USA). It is the sole high school in the Wells Independent School District. In 2015, the school was rated "Improvement Required" by the Texas Education Agency.

Athletics
The Wells Pirates compete in the following sports:

Baseball
Basketball
Cross Country
Golf
Softball
Tennis
Track and Field

References

External links 
 Official website

Public high schools in Texas
Schools in Cherokee County, Texas